12 Crass Songs is the fourth album by anti-folk artist Jeffrey Lewis.  It was released on October 1, 2007 on Rough Trade Records. The title is literal, as all 12 songs on the album were written and first recorded by the band Crass.

Track listing 
"End Result"
"I Ain't Thick, It's Just a Trick"
"Systematic Death"
"The Gasman Cometh"
"Banned from the Roxy"
"Where Next Columbus?"
"Do They Owe Us a Living?"
"Securicor"
"Demoncrats"
"Big A, Little A"
"Punk Is Dead"
"Walls (Fun in the Oven)"

Origin 

In a 2013 interview with Audio Antihero Records, Jeffrey Lewis explained his motivation for the album:

References

2007 albums
Covers albums
Jeffrey Lewis albums
Rough Trade Records albums
Crass